Stewart MacDonald (born December 29, 1949) is an American rower. He competed at the 1968 Summer Olympics and the 1972 Summer Olympics.

References

External links
 

1949 births
Living people
American male rowers
Olympic rowers of the United States
Rowers at the 1968 Summer Olympics
Rowers at the 1972 Summer Olympics
Rowers from Boston